Party of Two was the 1983 EP by American power pop band the Rubinoos released by Beserkley Records and re-released by Wounded Bird Records, March 13, 2007, with bonus tracks.

It was executive produced by Todd Rundgren with original members Jon Rubin and Tommy Dunbar supported by Utopia's Roger Powell, Kasim Sulton and Willie Wilcox.

Track listing
 "If I Had You Back"
 "Faded Dream"    
 "The Girl"    
 "Crash Landing"    
 "The Magic's Back"

2007 bonus tracks
 "Over You" 
 " Facts of Love" 
 "Stop Before We Start"
 "If I Had You Back" (demo version)
 "The Girl" (demo version) 
 "Crash Landing" (demo version)

Personnel
Jon Rubin – vocals
Tommy Dunbar – vocals, all guitars, keyboards
Roger Powell – keyboards
Kasim Sulton - bass
Willie Wilcox - drums & programming

References

1983 EPs
The Rubinoos albums
Albums produced by Todd Rundgren
Beserkley Records albums